The Women's duet event at the 2015 European Games in Baku was held from 12 to 15 June at the Baku Aquatics Centre.

Schedule
All times are local (UTC+5).

Results

Preliminary

Final

References

External links

Duet